Deborah Gonzalez is an American attorney and politician from Georgia. 
Gonzalez was elected as a District Attorney for Georgia's Western Circuit district on December 1, 2020, and is a former Democratic member of the Georgia General Assembly. She served as a state representative for Georgia House District 117 from November 27, 2017, until January 14, 2019.

Legal career and political service
Gonzalez is a practicing attorney, with more than 20 years experience. Her practice has concentrated in the area of media and entertainment and social media and technology.

On June 10, 2017 Gonzalez announced her intention to run for District 117 in the Georgia House of Representatives. She subsequently won with 53 percent of the vote in a November 2017 special election. The vacancy in the seat was created when her predecessor was appointed by Georgia Governor Nathan Deal to serve as a Superior Court Judge.

In the November 2018 general election, Gonzalez was defeated in her attempt to win a full term when Houston Gaines reclaimed the seat for the Republican party.

On July 11, 2019, Gonzalez announced her candidacy to run for district attorney in the Western Judicial Circuit, which serves Athens-Clarke and Oconee counties, to succeed incumbent Ken Mauldin who announced his retirement effective February 29, 2020, 10 months prior to the end of his term. However, Governor Brian Kemp refused to announce by May 3, 2020 an acting replacement for the remainder of Maudlin's term, which under House Bill 907 (passed 2018) would delay the primary and election for the office to 2022. Gonzalez filed a federal lawsuit against Kemp and Georgia Secretary of State Brad Raffensperger over the law in order to force the special election to take place, with Judge Mark Howard Cohen of the District Court for the Northern District of Georgia ruling in Gonzalez's favor. The state appealed the ruling to the United States Court of Appeals for the Eleventh Circuit, who referred the case to the Georgia Supreme Court. On October 11, the Court ruled in Gonzalez's favor, finding that HB907 unconstitutionally allows the governor to appoint an acting district attorney to serve beyond the term of the prior incumbent rather than the remaining time left in the prior incumbent's term. The state relented and scheduled a blanket primary for the office for the November ballot.

A special election was held on November 3, 2020 and went to a runoff on December 1, 2020. Gonzalez defeated her opponent in the runoff, James Chafin, with 51.7% of the vote. She was the first Latina to be elected District Attorney in the state of Georgia.

Electoral history

References

Democratic Party members of the Georgia House of Representatives
Women state legislators in Georgia (U.S. state)
Living people
Year of birth missing (living people)
2020 United States presidential electors
District attorneys in Georgia (U.S. state)
21st-century American women politicians